Atlantic Bridge may refer to:
Atlantic Bridge, Panama, the third bridge across the Panama Canal
Atlantic Bridge (flight route), between Newfoundland and Scotland
Atlantic Bridge (album), by Davy Spillane
The Atlantic Bridge, a former organization promoting UK–US cooperation
Atlantik-Brücke (Atlantic Bridge), an organization promoting German–US cooperation
Atlantic Bridge or Bridge over the Atlantic, a nickname applied especially to Clachan Bridge in Scotland

See also
Atlantic Beach Bridge, New York, USA
Atlantic Ocean Tunnel, a road tunnel southwest of Kristiansund, Norway
Transatlantic (disambiguation)